Walter Dick (September 20, 1905 in Kirkintilloch, Scotland – July 24, 1989 in Lafayette, California) was a U.S. soccer forward who was a member of the U.S. national team at the 1934 FIFA World Cup.  He is a member of the U.S. National Soccer Hall of Fame.

Professional career
Dick began his professional career with Armadale F.C. in the Scottish Football League.  In 1923, at the age of seventeen, he moved to the United States, settling in Niagara Falls, New York.  When he arrived, he immediately began playing with the Niagara Falls Rangers.  The manager of Providence F.C. of the American Soccer League spotted Dick playing for Rangers and offered him a contract.  Dick went on to play six seasons with Providence between 1924 and 1930.  However, in 1928, the team changed its name to the Providence Gold Bugs.  By 1930, the ravages of the Great Depression and the "Soccer Wars" had begun to take their toll on the ASL and teams began to fold, move and merge.  In 1930, a group of businessmen led by Harold Brittan bought the team, and moved the team to Fall River, Massachusetts where it spent most of the 1930-1931 ASL season as Fall River F.C.  When Fall River merged with the New Bedford Whalers during the spring of 1931, Dick moved to the Pawtucket Rangers.  The Rangers left the ASL in the fall of 1932 as the league began to collapse, but joined the newly formed second American Soccer League in the fall of 1933.  In 1934 and 1935, the Rangers went to the National Challenge Cup, only to fall to Stix, Baer and Fuller F.C. in 1934 and the same team, only renamed St. Louis Central Breweries F.C. in 1935.  In 1937, he joined the Kearny Scots-Americans and remained with the team through the 1941 season.  During that span, Kearny won five league championships.

National team
In 1934, Dick earned one cap with the U.S. national team at the 1934 FIFA World Cup.  In that game, the U.S. lost to Italy in the first round of the cup.

Dick was inducted into the New England Soccer Hall of Fame in 1985 and the National Soccer Hall of Fame in 1989.

See also
List of United States men's international soccer players born outside the United States

External links
 National Soccer Hall of Fame profile

1905 births
1989 deaths
American soccer players
Armadale F.C. players
United States men's international soccer players
1934 FIFA World Cup players
American Soccer League (1921–1933) players
Providence Clamdiggers players
Providence Gold Bug players
Fall River F.C. players
Pawtucket Rangers players
British emigrants to the United States
American Soccer League (1933–1983) players
Kearny Scots-Americans players
National Soccer Hall of Fame members
Sportspeople from Kirkintilloch
Niagara Falls Rangers players
Association football forwards
Scottish footballers